The NPO Almaz S 200 Angara/Vega/Dubna (Russian С-200 Ангара/Вега/Дубна), NATO reporting name SA-5 Gammon (initially Tallinn), is a long range, high altitude surface-to-air missile (SAM) system developed by the Soviet Union in the 1960s to defend large areas from high-altitude bombers or other targets. In Soviet service, these systems were deployed primarily on the battalion level, with six launchers and a fire control radar. 

The S-200 can be linked to other, longer-range radar systems.

Description 

The S-200 surface-to-air missile system was designed for the defense of the most important administrative, industrial and military installations from all types of air attack. The S-200 is an all-weather system that can be operated in various climatic conditions.

By 1966, the S-200 was officially accepted into service in order to replace the failed anti-ballistic missile RZ-25/5V11 "Dal". The Dal was assigned the NATO reporting name SA-5 "Griffon" before it was cancelled.

The first S-200 operational regiments were deployed in 1966 with 18 sites and 342 launchers in service by the end of the year. By 1968 there were 40 sites, and by 1969 there were 60 sites. The growth in numbers then gradually increased throughout the 1970s (1,100 launchers) and early 1980s until the peak of 130 sites and 2,030 launchers was reached in 1980–1990.

Missiles 

Each missile is launched by 4 solid-fueled strap-on rocket boosters. After they burn out and drop away (between 3 and 5.1 seconds from launch) it fires a 5D67 liquid fueled sustainer rocket engine (for 51–150 seconds) which burns a fuel called TG-02 Samin (50% xylidine and 50% triethylamine), oxidized by an agent called AK-27P (red fuming nitric acid enriched with nitrogen oxides, phosphoric acid and hydrofluoric acid). The missile uses radio illumination mid-course correction to fly towards the target with a terminal semi-active radar homing phase. Maximum missile speed is 2500 m/s and maximum target speed is around Mach 6 for new model and Mach 4 for earlier model.

Main radar system 

It is used for both the tracking of targets and their illumination.

Additional radar systems 

 P-14/5N84A "Tall King" A-band early warning radar (range , 2–6 RPM, maximum search altitude  ) or 5N69 Salute "Big Back" E-band early warning radar 
 Kabina 66 "Back Net" or 5N87 "Back Trap" E-band early warning radar (with special low-altitude search mod, range , 3–6 RPM)
 P-35/37 "Bar Lock/Bar Lock B" 1,000 kW E/F-band target detection and tracking radar (with integrated IFF, range , 7 RPM)
 PRV-11 "Side Net" or  PRV-13 "Odd Pair" E-band height finding radar (also used by the S-75 Dvina, 2K11 Krug and 2K12 Kub, range , 3–6 RPM)
 P-15M(2) "Squat Eye" 380 kW C-band target detection radar (range )

Versions 
 S-200A "Angara" (SA-5a), with the V-860/5V21 or V-860P/5V21A missile, introduced in 1967, range 17-, ceiling /0.5–40.
 S200W "Wega" (SA-5b), with the V-860PV/5W21P, 5W28W missile, introduced in 1970, range  minimum 7 km, ceiling  superior limit 35, minimum height 0,05 km. Five divisions. Division – one goal and missiles at targets a maximum of 2. Missile has a semi-active radar homing. The launch – reclining, with a constant angle of elevation, from the launcher, is rotated horizontally.
The probability of hitting the target 0.66–0.99.
 S-200M "Vega-M" (SA-5b), with the V-880/5V28 or V-880N/5V28N² missile, range , ceiling 
 S-200VE "Vega-E" (SA-5b), with the V-880E/5V28E missile, export version, high-explosive warhead only, range  Minimum target size of 0.3 sq. meters. Speed of the target -1200 m / s  The number of simultaneously fired targets. Up to 5 (the number of radar targeting). Greater than previously opportunity fight against stealth.
 S-200D "Dubna" (SA-5c), with the 5V25V, V-880M/5V28M or V-880MN/5V28MN² missile, introduced in 1976, high-explosive or nuclear warhead, range , ceiling 0,3-. The probability of hitting the target 0,72-0,99.

The command post of the S-300 system (SA-20/SA-20A/SA-20B) can manage the elements of the S-200 and S-300 in any combination. The S-200 Dubna missile complex can be controlled by the S-300's command post, and the S-300 missile complex can be controlled by the S-400 command post or through a higher-level command post (Organize Use PVO
73N6 "Baikal-1").

Iranian air defense force has implemented several improvements on their S-200 systems such as using solid state parts and removing restrictions on working time. They destroyed a UAV target beyond 100 km range in military drill in recent years. They use two new solid propellant missile named Sayyad-2 and Sayyad-3 via interface systems Talash-2 and Talash-3 in cooperation with S-200 system. These missiles can cover medium and long ranges at high altitudes.

Also, Iran claims to have developed a mobile launcher for the system.

Operational history

Ukraine
A Ukrainian S-200 operated by the Ukrainian military during a Ukrainian training exercise fired on a Tupolev Tu-154 passenger aircraft flying from Tel Aviv to Novosibirsk, Siberia Airlines Flight 1812. The airliner was destroyed over the Black Sea on 4 October 2001, killing all 78 people on board.

Libya
Starting in 1985, Libya received a number of S-200 missile systems. In the following months, Libyan forces fired a number of S-200 missiles in different occasions at US fighter-bombers, missing them.
In the USSR, three organizations (CDB Almaz, a test site and a research institute of the Ministry of Defense) conducted computer simulation of the battle, which gave the probability of hitting each of the air targets (3) in the range from 96 to 99%.

Syria 
Starting in January 1983, Syria received supplies of S-200 missiles from the Soviet Union. They were organized into two long range surface to air missile regiments, each composed of two battalions of two batteries each for a total of at least 24 launchers. Later in the 1980s, the Soviet Union agreed to supply a third regiment increasing the number of launchers to 40–50.
Initially the missiles were manned by Soviet crews, later they were transferred to Syrian control. As such, Syria became the first country outside the Soviet Union to field the S-200 system.

During the initial years of the Syrian civil war, parts of the S-200 systems were occasionally spotted when Syrian Air Defense Force sites were overrun by rebel forces. Most notably radars, missiles and other equipment from S-200 systems was pictured in a state of disrepair when rebels overtook the air defense site in Eastern Ghouta in October 2012. On 2 January 2017, the Syrian Army re-captured this air defense base.

Starting with the Russian intervention in the civil war in late 2015, there were new efforts to restore some Syrian S-200 systems. Indeed, on 15 November 2016, the Russian defence minister confirmed that Russian forces repaired Syrian S-200s to operational status. For example, in July 2016, the Syrian Army, with Russian assistance, rebuilt an S-200 site at Kweires airport, near Aleppo.
On September 12, 2016, the Israel Defense Forces confirmed that two Syrian S-200 missiles were fired at Israeli aircraft while they were on a mission inside Syrian airspace. The Syrian Defense Ministry claimed that an Israeli jet and a drone were shot down. According to the IDF spokesman's office, the claims are "total lies," and "at no point was the safety of IDF aircraft compromised."

On March 17, 2017, the Israeli Air Force attacked a number of Syrian armed forces targets near Palmyria in Syria. Four Israeli aircraft flew through Lebanese territory and launched Popeye stand off missiles with a range of 78 km toward Syrian territory. Syrian Air defence force (SyADF) after some time alerted one S-200V (SA-5) missile battery and tried to retaliate, 2 out of 4 attacking jets were illuminated with two 5N62 Fire Control Radars and missiles were fired on 2 targets, which then were over southern Lebanon. During the action a number of Syrian S-200 missiles were fired at the Israeli aircraft. One of the Syrian missiles, going ballistic after losing its target, was inbound to a populated area in Israel. The Israeli missile defense fired at least one Arrow missile which intercepted the incoming missile. Two other S-200 missiles landed in other parts of Israel, having lost their target. According to ANNA News, Syria claimed that they had shot down one IAF F-16 aircraft and damaged another. While the Syrian Defense Ministry claimed that an Israeli fighter jet was shot down, which was denied by Israel, Israeli defence minister Avigdor Lieberman threatened to destroy Syrian air defence systems after they fired ground-to-air missiles at Israeli warplanes carrying out strikes.  The Jordanian armed forces reported that parts of a missile fell in its territory. There were no casualties in Jordan.

On October 16, 2017, a Syrian S-200 battery located around 50 kilometers east of Damascus fired a missile at an Israeli Air Force surveillance mission over Lebanon. The IAF responded by attacking the battery and destroying the fire control radar with four bombs.
Despite this, the Syrian Defense Ministry said in its statement that the air-defense forces "directly hit one of the jets, forcing [Israeli aircraft] to retreat." Israel said that no plane was hit.

On February 10, 2018, Israel launched an air strike against targets in Syria with eight fighter aircraft as retaliation for a UAV incursion into Israeli airspace earlier in the day. Syrian air defenses succeeded in shooting down one of the Israeli jets, an F-16I Sufa, with an S-200 missile - this was the first Israeli  jet to be shot down in combat since 1982. The jet crashed in the Jezreel Valley, near Harduf. Both the pilot and the navigator managed to eject; one was injured lightly, the other more seriously, but both survived and walked out of the hospital one week later.

On 10 May 2018, Israeli Air Force launched Operation House of Cards against a number of Iranian and Syrian targets, claiming the destruction of a S-200 radar among different other targets. 

On September 17, 2018, a Russian Il-20M ELINT plane was shot down by a Syrian S-200 surface-to-air missile killing all the 15 servicemen on board. Four Israeli F-16 fighter jets attacked targets in Syria's Latakia with standoff missiles, after approaching from the Mediterranean Sea, a statement by the Russian defense ministry said on 18 September. “The Israeli pilots used the Russian plane as cover and set it up to be targeted by the Syrian air defense forces. As a consequence, the Il-20, which has radar cross-section much larger than the F-16, was shot down by an S-200 system missile,” the statement said. The Russian ministry stressed that the Israelis must have known that the Russian plane was present in the area, which didn't stop them from “the provocation”. Israel also failed to warn Russia about the planned operation in advance. The warning came a minute before the attack started, which “did not leave time to move the Russian plane to a safe area,” the statement said.
On 21 September, an Israeli delegation visiting Moscow stated that the Israeli attack formation did not use the Russian Il-20 as a shield during the attacks, while blaming the incident on the Syrian Air Defense Force which fired missiles for forty minutes while the Israeli attack formation had already left the area. Russian President Vladimir Putin downplayed the incident saying that "it looks accidental, like a chain of tragic circumstances".

On 1 July 2019, a stray S-200 missile fired from Syria, presumably during bombing raids there, hit Northern Cyprus. The missile hit the ground around 1:00a.m. near the village of Taşkent, also known as Vouno, some 20 kilometers (12 miles) northeast of Nicosia. The missile that hit Cyprus was a Russian-made S-200, said the Turkish Cypriot foreign minister.

On 22 April 2021, a stray S-200 missile exploded in the air some 30 kilometers from the Dimona nuclear reactor over Israel. The missile was fired from Dumayr, part of a salvo in response to Israeli jets conducting strikes on targets in the Syrian-controlled Golan Heights. Israeli air defenses tried to intercept the errant missile, but missed. Around an hour later, IDF said Israeli fighter jets struck the air defense battery which launched the missile.
On 19 August 2021, in response to an Israeli air raid, the Syrian Air Defense fired several Surface to Air missiles at attacking Israeli jets and missiles. One of them, an S-200 due to the range, exploded above the Dead Sea. On 3 September 2021, Syrian army fired a missile over Tel Aviv which landed in Mediterranean Sea. In response to Syrian missile attack, the Israeli Air Force claim destroyed a battery of the Russian-made S-200 missile system of Syrian Army.

Operators

Current operators 
  –  10
  –  1 battalion.
  –  10 Upgraded battalions, in service. Will be replaced by Sayyad-2/Sayyad-3 (Talash)system.
 
 
  – 4 battalions (2008). 40 systems in 2010 (number of constituent elements is unknown).
  – 2 squadrons. To be replaced by new anti aircraft systems Wisła.
  – 2 air defense regiments comprising 02 Div. including 2 S-200 batteries with 2 tech.div inkl. special w.h. (43 launchers / ≈50/ 48) in service as of 2010, S-200VE 48 launchers in 2012 Syrian Armed Forces constructed a new S-200 site at Kweires Airport, near Dahab, in July 2016. The system is operated by the Syrian Air Defense Force.

Former operators 
  – 1 battalion.
  – Approximately 4 battalions.
  – 5 battalions, passed to Czech Republic.
  – Inherited all Czechoslovak S-200 SAM systems, out of service since mid-1990s.
  – 4 battalions, passed to unified Germany.
 
  – 4 battalions from former GDR, phased out around 1991
  – 1 battalion.*
  - 2 battalions, retired in 2015.
  – 8 battalions.
  –  1 Battalion
  – The Mongolian People's Army operated 4 battalions as of 1985, but it is unlikely there are any operational as of 2011.
  - No longer in service as of 2014
  – Last division was retired on October 30, 2013 
  – Originally deployed with the ZA-PVO in the strategic air defense role. It was phased out starting in the 1980s and passed on to the successor states before the phasing out process could be completed.

See also 
 S-75 Dvina
 Bloodhound (missile)
 MIM-14 Nike Hercules
 Sayyad-2
 Sayyad-3
 List of NATO reporting names for surface-to-air missiles
 List of surface-to-air missiles

References

External links 

 Federation of American Scientists page
 Astronautix.com
 S-200 battalion locations and satellite photos
 S-200 walkaround photos on airforce.ru

Cold War surface-to-air missiles of the Soviet Union
Science and technology in the Soviet Union
Surface-to-air missiles of the Soviet Union
Surface-to-air missiles of Russia
Almaz-Antey products
Military equipment introduced in the 1960s